An Clochán (anglicized as Cloghane;  from clochán, a local type of dry-stone hut) is a Gaeltacht village and townland on the Dingle Peninsula of County Kerry, Ireland, at the foot of Mount Brandon. In 1974 the village was added to the Corca Dhuibhne Gaeltacht (Irish-speaking region).  It has a population of 297 (2011 Census).

Cloghane and Brandon (An Clochán agus Cé Bhréanainn) are jointly twinned with the village of Plozévet in Brittany (France).
The village is set at the foot of Mount Brandon, on the north of the Dingle Peninsula and overlooking Brandon Bay. The village is on the Wild Atlantic Way tourism trail.

An Clochán was the subject of a controversial and influential anthropological study by Nancy Scheper Hughes in the early 1970s, published as "Saints, Scholars and Schizophrenics: Mental Illness in Rural Ireland".

History 
According to A Topographical Dictionary of Ireland by Samuel Lewis, the town's population stood at around 222 people in 1837.

See also
 List of towns and villages in Ireland

References

Towns and villages in County Kerry
Gaeltacht towns and villages
Gaeltacht places in County Kerry